College Lovers is a 1930 American talkie Pre-Code   comedy film produced and released by First National Pictures, a subsidiary of Warner Bros., and directed by John G. Adolfi. The movie stars Jack Whiting, Marian Nixon, Frank McHugh and Guinn 'Big Boy' Williams. The film was based on the story by Earl Baldwin.

Plot
Guinn 'Big Boy' Williams, a star football player, decides to leave Sanford college after he has found that his girlfriend has eloped with another man. He is drive to the train station by Russell Hopton, his best friend, and also a football player for the same college. Jack Whiting, who plays the part of the student manager of the Sanford college athletic association as well as part of the president of the student body, knows that the college needs Williams to win the important game against Colton college.

Whiting conspires with his girlfriend, played by Marian Nixon, to stop Williams from leaving. He also makes use of Frank McHugh, who plays the part of Whiting's assistant in the film. Nixon fakes a suicide on a bridge when she notices Hopton and Williams approaching. They quickly run to help  her and both of them fall in love with her, without realizing that she really love Whiting. Williams and Hopton soon become suspicious of each other and constantly spy on each other, leaving Nixon to spend her time with Whiting. Just before the big game, Hopton and Williams have an argument and show no interest in the upcoming game. Whiting suggests that Nixon write each of them an identical love note, telling the recipient that she loves him alone.

When Williams and Hopton receive these notes, they end their quarrelling, each thinking that Nixon prefers them to the other. Halfway through the game, one of them discovers the other's note and they begin  accusing each other of stealing their notes. Their fighting causes them to be benched. Colton ties the score and promises to be the winner, which so scares Hopton and Williams that they shake hands and go back into the game. When the winning touchdown for Sanford is a matter of inches away from the goal line, the two backs waste the last minute of the game trying to decide which of them will have the honor of making the final touchdown and the game ends in a tie.

Cast
Jack Whiting as Frank Taylor  
Marian Nixon as Madge Hutton  
Frank McHugh as Speed Haskins  
Guinn 'Big Boy' Williams as Tiny Courtley
Russell Hopton as Eddie Smith 
Wade Boteler as Coach Donovan 
Phyllis Crane as Josephine Crane
Richard Tucker as Gene Hutton
Charles Judels as Spectator
Pauline Wagner as Frank McHugh's girl friend

Production
The film was planned as a full-scale musical comedy. The majority of the musical numbers of this film, however, were cut out before general release in the United States because the public had grown tired of musicals by late 1930. Although music was mentioned when the film was first released, ads and reviews soon mentioned that, even though Jack Whiting was a musical comedy star, there was no singing in the picture. These cuts accounts for the very short length of the film. The film was marketed as a straight comedy film. The complete musical film was released intact in countries outside the United States where a backlash against musicals never occurred.

Songs
Although some modern sources mention the songs "One Minute of Heaven" and "Up and At 'Em" as being performed in this film, they were actually written for the 1929 musical comedy The Forward Pass. Since the film is now lost, and the music was cut from circulating prints in the United States, it is not certain what songs were written for this picture.

Preservation
No film elements are known to survive, although there is a copy of the screenplay in the Department of Rare Books and Special Collections at  Princeton University Library. The soundtrack, which was recorded on Vitaphone disks, may survive in private hands. It is unknown whether a copy of this full version still exists.

See also
List of lost films

References

External links

1930 films
First National Pictures films
1930s English-language films
Lost American films
Warner Bros. films
Films directed by John G. Adolfi
American black-and-white films
American comedy films
1930 comedy films
1930 lost films
Lost comedy films
1930s American films